The 1956 United States presidential election in Utah took place on November 6, 1956, as part of the 1956 United States presidential election. State voters chose four representatives, or electors, to the Electoral College, who voted for president and vice president.

Utah was won by incumbent President Dwight D. Eisenhower (R–Pennsylvania), running with Vice President Richard Nixon, with 64.56 percent of the popular vote, against Adlai Stevenson (D–Illinois), running with Senator Estes Kefauver, with 35.44 percent of the popular vote.

Results

Results by county

See also
 United States presidential elections in Utah

Notes

References

Utah
1956
1956 Utah elections